Rais is a Muslim title.

Rais may also refer to:

People

Given name 
 Rais Abin (1926–2021), Indonesian military officer and diplomat
 Rais Bhuiyan (born 1973), Bangladeshi American hate crime victim who forgave his shooter
 Rais Hamidu (1773–1815), Algerian corsair
 Rais Khan (1939–2017), Indian sitar player
 Raïs M'Bolhi (born 1986), Algerian footballer
 Rais Sitdikov (born 1988), Russian footballer
 Rais Yatim (born 1942), Information, Communications, and Culture Minister of Malaysia

Surname 
 Amber Rais (born 1981), American professional cyclist 
 Amien Rais (born 1944), Indonesian politician
 Gilles de Rais (1405–1440), leader of the French army and companion-in-arms of Joan of Arc, and serial killer of children
 Julia Rais (born 1971), Malaysian actress and princess
 Karel Václav Rais (1859–1926), Czech novelist
 Muhammad Rais, Indonesian terrorist
 Salih Reis or Rais (c. 1488-1568), Turkish privateer and Ottoman Empire admiral

Other 
 Rais, founder of the Raisani, a Pakistani tribe
 Rais people, one of Nepal's most ancient indigenous ethnolinguistic groups 
 Saint Rais (died 303), Christian saint

Places 
 Rais, Iran, a village in Kermanshah Province, Iran
 Rais, South Khorasan, a village in South Khorasan Province, Iran
 Rais, a village in Algeria that was the site of the Rais massacre of 1997

Other uses 
 Redundant Array of Inexpensive Servers, multiple computers in a server farm

See also
 Raees (disambiguation)
 Reis (disambiguation)
 Rai (disambiguation)